Wheel-well stowaways are people who attempt to travel in the landing gear compartment, also known as the wheel bay or undercarriage of an aircraft. Between 1947 and June 2015, a U.S. Federal Aviation Administration (FAA) researcher had documented 113 such attempts on 101 flights. These 113 people were all male and predominantly under age 30. There were 86 deaths, a 76 percent fatality rate, with many unidentified decedents. There may be additional undocumented cases of wheel-well stowaways. A further 19 incidents, identified since 2015, are listed here.

Wheel-well stowaways face considerable risk of death during all phases of flight. Some have been unable to remain in the well during takeoff and landing and have fallen to their death. Immediately after takeoff, the landing gear retracts into the wheel wells, with the potential to crush the stowaway. If the stowaway is able to avoid physical injury, they still face hypothermia and hypoxia risks at the extremely low temperatures and low atmospheric pressure at high altitude, as well as hearing damage from prolonged exposure to the dangerously high noise levels outside the cabin.

Aeromedical physiology
At altitudes above , stowaways may also develop decompression sickness and nitrogen gas embolism.

As the plane descends to lower altitudes, a gradual rewarming and reoxygenation occur; if the stowaway does not regain consciousness and mobility by the time the landing gear is lowered during final approach, or has already died, the body may fall from the aircraft. According to the FAA, it is likely that the number of stowaways is higher than records show because bodies have fallen into the ocean or in  remote areas. Many wheel-well stowaways are found, dead or alive, with their bodies covered in frost, suggesting severe hypothermia during flight.

How those wheel-well stowaways who have survived have done so is a question scientists have not yet been able to answer. "Something happens that we don't understand" says one. Dr. Stephen Véronneau, a research medical officer at FAA's Civil Aerospace Medical Institute, described as the world's foremost expert on the phenomenon, wrote in a 1996 paper for the FAA that he believes humans, when placed in an environment that overwhelms the body's ability to control its own temperature, become poikilothermic and "a state somewhat reminscent of hibernation occurs, during which the body's requirement for oxygen is greatly diminished". Véronneau later documented 99 cases worldwide of wheel well stowaways from 1947 through June 6, 2013, with 76 fatalities and 23 survivors, and noted there may be additional undocumented cases of successful surviving wheel-well stowaways also escaping the aircraft undetected, potentially with the assistance of accomplices.

One survivor, Armando Socarras Ramirez, who defected from Cuba aboard an Iberia flight from Havana to Madrid in 1969, recalled in 2021 that his earliest post-flight memories are of Spanish doctors calling him "Mr. Popsicle" because ice covered his body when the pilot discovered him after his arrival. He had boarded the plane while it was taxiing, carrying a flashlight, rope, and wool to stuff his ears; a companion fell out of the other wheel well before takeoff and a third backed out at the last moment. After takeoff, he had suffered frostbite on his middle finger so severe it turned black holding on until the wheels retracted, but then remembered nothing save shivering and shaking from the extreme cold until he lost consciousness. It took him a month in a Spanish hospital to regain his hearing, but he reports no lingering medical issues from the experience.

In the media

Wheel-well stowaways have been widely covered in the press and media at large throughout the history of passenger airlines. One of the most notable incidents involved Keith Sapsford (14) from Sydney, Australia who fell  to his death from the wheel-well of a Tokyo bound Japan Air Lines Douglas DC-8 on February 24, 1970, shortly after takeoff from Sydney Kingsford Smith Airport. Amateur photographer John Gilpin was taking pictures of planes taking off that day, and did not realize he had captured the boy's final moments until he developed the pictures a week later. The photo was then famously featured in Life magazine's issue for the week of March 6, 1970, in their "Parting Shots" section of particularly newsworthy photos, across the fold of a two-page spread, alongside photos of spectators tossed into the air and killed at a stock car race in Luanda, Angola and a fatal shootout in a Los Angeles, California store.

List of wheel-well stowaways
Below is a chronological list of documented aircraft wheel-well stowaway incidents. Stowaways have also traveled in a cargo hold, or in a spare parts compartment, both of which are pressurized, or even in the pressurized cabin itself. In at least one other instance, on July 31, 2013, a cat survived a flight from Athens to Zürich in the front undercarriage of an Airbus A321. Those types of incidents are not included in the scope of the list below.

External links
 Out of the Blue and Into the Lawn: The Mystery Stowaway

References

Flight lists
Lists of aviation accidents and incidents
Unidentified decedents